The New Orleans class of protected cruisers of the United States Navy consisted of two ships which were building for the Brazilian Navy at Elswick, near Newcastle Upon Tyne, England, by Armstrong Whitworth. One ship was delivered to Brazil, named . The third ship was fitting out as Amazonas, and the fourth was on order as Almirante Abreu.

On 16 March 1898 the United States Navy purchased the undelivered ships to prevent them being acquired by the Spanish Navy and to augment the US Navy shortly before the Spanish–American War.

Design and construction

Armament

These ships were originally armed with six /50 caliber rapid fire (RF) guns and four /50 caliber RF guns. These were British-made export-model guns built by Elswick Ordnance Company, a subsidiary of Armstrong. One source states the 6-inch guns were Elswick Pattern DD and the 4.7-inch guns were Pattern AA. These guns were unique in the US Navy, and they were designated as "6"/50 caliber Mark 5 Armstrong guns" and "4.7"/50 caliber Mark 3 Armstrong guns". The 6-inch guns were arranged with one each fore and aft, and two each fore and aft in sponsons on the sides to allow ahead or astern fire. The 4.7-inch guns were on the broadside. Three  torpedo tubes for Whitehead torpedoes were also equipped. Additional weapons included ten 6-pounder  Hotchkiss RF guns, eight 1-pounder  RF guns, and four .30-cal. (7.62 mm) Maxim machine guns.

Armor

Harvey armor was used on these ships. The main guns had  shields and the conning tower had  armor. One source also lists  on the boiler room glacis.

Engineering

The normal coal allowance was 512 tons, but this could be increased to 747 tons.

Refits

To reduce supply difficulties, during refits at the Cavite Navy Yard in the Philippines in 1903, both ships had their 4.7-inch guns replaced with standard /50 caliber Mark 5 guns; the 6-inch guns were replaced with additional 5-inch guns in 1907. Their torpedo tubes were also removed in the 1903 refits. At least some of the guns from these ships were emplaced in the Grande Island/Subic Bay area 1907-1910 and operated by the United States Marine Corps until the Coast Artillery Corps' modern defenses centered on Fort Wint were completed. During World War I the 5-inch guns were reduced from ten to eight and a /50 caliber anti-aircraft gun was added. At least one 6-inch gun Mark 5 was delivered to the Army during that war for potential service on M1917B field carriages on the Western Front; it is unclear if these weapons were shipped overseas.

Service
 (ex-Amazonas) served in the Spanish–American War, World War I and the Russian civil war in Siberia.

 (ex-Almirante Abreu) was completed too late to see service in the Spanish–American War. She served first in the Philippine–American War and then in World War I and the Russian civil war in Siberia.

Both cruisers were decommissioned in 1922 and were sold for scrapping in 1930.

Ships in class

The two ships of the New Orleans class were:

These ships did not initially have hull numbers. On 17 July 1920 they were designated with the hull numbers PG-34 (gunboat) and PG-36. On 8 August 1921 they were redesignated with the hull numbers CL-22 (light cruiser) and CL-23.

Legacy

Two 4.7-inch guns (one from each ship of the class) are preserved at the Kane County, Illinois Soldier and Sailor Monument at the former courthouse in Geneva, Illinois.

See also
  - unrelated New Orleans-class cruisers in commission 1930s–1950s.
 List of cruisers of the United States Navy

References

Bibliography

External links

Cruiser photo gallery index at NavSource Naval History

 

Cruiser classes
 
Protected cruisers of the United States Navy
World War I cruisers of the United States
Allied intervention in the Russian Civil War
Spanish–American War cruisers of the United States
Philippine–American War ships of the United States